Daniel Espartaco Sánchez (Chihuahua, México, 1977) is a Mexican writer. His second issue of short stories, Cosmonauta  (Cosmonaut  - FETA, 2011)  and his first novel, Autos usados  (Used cars - Random House Mondadori, 2012) appeared in the "best book of the year" lists (2011 and 2012 respectively) from the Mexican magazine Nexos.

He's been a grant holder of the Fondo Nacional para la Cultura y las Artes (National Fund for Arts and Culture) and has won several national writing awards. In 2012 the American publication Picnic Magazine included him as one of the representative profiles of the contemporary literature in México.

In 2013 his first novel, Autos usados, was awarded with the Colima Prize for fiction (Premio Bellas Artes de Narrativa Colima para Obra Publicada), one of the most importants of Mexico.

Books 
 Memorias de un hombre nuevo Literatura Random House, México, 2015.
 Bisontes (Nouvelle). Nitro press. México, 2013.
 Autos usados (Novela). Random House Mondadori. México, 2012.
 Cosmonauta (Relatos). Dirección General de Publicaciones. Fondo Editorial Tierra Adentro. México, 2011.

References

External links 
 Esquire Latinoamerica / Interview
 El Norte Digital. Ciudad Juárez / Interview
 Best Fiction of 2011 / Nexos / Review
 El Economista / Interview

1977 births
Living people
Mexican novelists
People from Chihuahua City